The men's sabre was one of ten fencing events on the fencing at the 2000 Summer Olympics programme. It was the twenty-fourth appearance of the event. The competition was held on 21 September 2000. 39 fencers from 20 nations competed. Nations had been limited to three fencers each since 1928. The event was won by Mihai Covaliu of Romania, the nation's first medal in the men's sabre. Mathieu Gourdain's silver extended France's podium streak in the event to five Games. Germany also earned its first medal in the men's sabre, with Wiradech Kothny's bronze.

Background

This was the 24th appearance of the event, which is the only fencing event to have been held at every Summer Olympics. Five of the quarterfinalists from 1996 returned: gold medalist Stanislav Pozdnyakov and silver medalist Sergey Sharikov of Russia, bronze medalist Damien Touya of France, sixth-place finisher Vadym Huttsait of Ukraine, and seventh-place finisher Rafał Sznajder of Poland. The three world champions since the Atlanta Games were Pozdnyakov (1997), Luigi Tarantino of Italy (1998), and Touya (1999).

Belarus and Kazakhstan each made their debut in the men's sabre. Italy made its 22nd appearance in the event, most of any nation, having missed the inaugural 1896 event and the 1904 Games.

Competition format

The 1996 tournament had vastly simplified the competition format into a single-elimination bracket, with a bronze medal match. The 2000 tournament continued to use that format. Bouts were to 15 touches. Standard sabre rules regarding target area, striking, and priority were used.

Schedule

All times are Australian Eastern Standard Time (UTC+10)

Results

The field of 40 fencers competed in a single-elimination tournament to determine the medal winners. Semifinal losers proceeded to a bronze medal match.

Section 1

Section 2

Section 3

Section 4

Finals

Final classification

References

External links 
 Official Report of the 2000 Sydney Summer Olympics

Sabre men
Men's events at the 2000 Summer Olympics